The Kaikou River is a river of the Northland Region of New Zealand's North Island. It flows initially north, then east, and finally south, from its source approximately halfway between Dargaville and Kaikohe, before joining with the Moengawahine Stream to become the Hikurangi River.

See also
List of rivers of New Zealand

References

Whangarei District
Rivers of the Northland Region
Rivers of New Zealand
Kaipara Harbour catchment